Indian Creek is a stream in the U.S. state of Ohio. It is a tributary of Brandywine Creek.

Indian Creek was so named on account the area being a favorite Native American camping ground.

See also
List of rivers of Ohio

References

Rivers of Cuyahoga County, Ohio
Rivers of Summit County, Ohio
Rivers of Ohio